Aleksandar Simić (Serbian Cyrillic: Александар Cимић; born 31 January 1980) is a Serbian footballer midfielder, who plays for FK Kolubara in the Serbian First League.

Club career
Simić previously played for Radnički Jugopetrol, OFK Beograd, FC Istres in the French Ligue 2., OFI Crete and Larissa. On 8 July 2013 he signed a one-year contract with Iraklis, but he was released just 51 days later, eventually signing a contract with Kerkyra.

References

External links
 Aleksandar Simić at Srbijafudbal
 

1980 births
Living people
Serbian footballers
Serbian expatriate footballers
Association football midfielders
FK Radnički Beograd players
OFK Beograd players
FK Voždovac players
Serbian SuperLiga players
FC Istres players
Expatriate footballers in France
OFI Crete F.C. players
Athlitiki Enosi Larissa F.C. players
Panserraikos F.C. players
Iraklis Thessaloniki F.C. players
Expatriate footballers in Greece
FK Rad players
Ligue 2 players
Super League Greece players